Masks is a 1987 French mystery thriller film directed by Claude Chabrol. It was entered into the 37th Berlin International Film Festival.

Plot
Talent show host Christian Legagneur hires a young reporter, Roland Wolf, to write his biography. However, Wolf has ulterior motives - he is also investigating his sister's disappearance.

Cast
 Philippe Noiret as Christian Legagneur
 Robin Renucci as Roland Wolf
 Bernadette Lafont as Patricia, La masseuse / The masseuse
 Monique Chaumette as Colette, la secrétaire / The secretary
 Anne Brochet as Catherine
 Roger Dumas as Manu
 Pierre-François Dumeniaud as Max
 Pierre Nougaro as Gustave
 Renée Dennsy as Émilie
 Yvonne Décade as Antoinette
 Blanche Ariel as Rosette
 René Marjac as Maurice
 Paul Vally as Henry
 Denise Pezzani as Mme Lemonier

Reception
The film received mixed reviews. Time Out said "Chabrol frames the verbal sparring with characteristic precision, but the subtle plot suffers from a surfeit of politesse and a dearth of red-blooded passion." The New York Times called it "something practically unheard of in the vast Chabrol filmography: a thriller that satisfies the audience's expectations of a thriller, even including the childlike hope that good will be rewarded and evil punished", and added "although the suspense is skillfully engineered, you can't help feeling Mr. Chabrol's boredom with it." Jonathan Rosenbaum said it was "good, serviceable, quasi-Hitchcockian fun", but not especially memorable. Craig Williams on the BFI site was more positive: "The idea of the bourgeois mask concealing murderous impulses is prevalent throughout the director’s work, but there’s a streak of self-awareness in Masques... that marks this as one of his best films of the 80s."

References

External links

1987 films
1980s crime thriller films
French crime thriller films
1980s French-language films
Films directed by Claude Chabrol
Films about entertainers
Films set in country houses
Films about journalists
French satirical films
1987 comedy films
1980s French films